Steve, Steven or Stephen James may refer to:

Sports
 Steve James (cricketer) (born 1967), English cricketer and journalist
 Steve James (footballer) (born 1949), English football player
 Stephen James (footballer) (born 1965), Australian rules footballer for Richmond
 Steve James (rugby) (born 1960), Australian rugby union player and rugby league coach
 Steve James (snooker player) (born 1961), English snooker player
 Steve Armstrong, real name Steve James (born 1965), American professional wrestler

Arts and entertainment
 Steve James (actor) (1952–1993), American actor
 Steve James (film producer) (born 1955), American producer and director
 Steven James (born 1969), American author

Music
 Steve James (blues musician) (born 1950), American blues musician
 Steve James (Christian musician) (born 1953), English-born contemporary Christian musician
 Steve James (DJ) (born 1998), American record producer, writer, and DJ

Other
 Stephen James (model) (born 1990), British model and former footballer

See also
Stephan James (disambiguation)